Raymond Charles Tesser (June 2, 1912 – November 2, 1982) was an American football player who played two seasons with the Pittsburgh Pirates of the National Football League. He played college football at Carnegie Mellon University.

Early years
Tesser graduated with high honors from Titusville High School in Titusville, Pennsylvania in 1930. He lettered in baseball, basketball, and football all four years of high school. He was inducted into the Titusville Area School District Athletic Hall of Fame in 2001.

College career
Tesser played football for two years at Carnegie Mellon University, enrolling in the Carnegie Institute of Technology.

Professional career
He had 19 receptions for 349 yards in his career.

References

External links
Just Sports Stats
1934 Diamond matchcover of Ray Tesser

1912 births
1982 deaths
Players of American football from Pennsylvania
American football ends
American football defensive ends
Carnegie Mellon Tartans football players
Pittsburgh Pirates (football) players
People from Titusville, Pennsylvania